, formerly known as , is a Japanese animation studio subsidiary of the Kinoshita Group.

Establishment
In 2015, Gainax established a new managing company to manage a studio and museum on  Miharu, Fukushima to take overseas outsourcing works and manage the museum. The objective and location was made to help the tourism on the region because of the Fukushima Daiichi nuclear disaster in 2011. In December 2015, Fukushima Gainax and Gainax became independent companies with no relation between each other besides the Gainax name, with the company entering their own projects later. 

In September 2016, the company established a new subsidiary in Tokyo. In August 2018, the company relocated its headquarters to its subsidiary in Tokyo making it the main company while transferring control to the museum in Fukushima to its new company called Fukushima Gaina the same month. On August 20, it was announced that the Kinoshita Group acquired the company and that the company changed its name to Gaina with its new parent company planning to make the new subsidiary a pillar of its anime production to expand its business.

Works

TV series
Forest of Piano (2018–2019)
Cap Revolution Bottleman DX (2022)
The Yakuza's Guide to Babysitting (2022, with Feel)
Hanabi-chan Is Often Late (2022)
Flaglia (2023)
Rescue Academy (TBA)

Original net animations
Bridge for Future (2015)
Masamune Datenicle (2016–2018)
Omoi no Kakera (2016)
Miharu no Amigo (2016)
Kumo no Kanata (2017)
Jinriki Senkan!? Shiokaze Sawakaze (2017)
Aihime Megohime (2019–2021)
Cap Revolution Bottleman (2020–2021)

Films
Uru in Blue (TBA)
Akubi wo Suru ni wa Wake ga Aru (TBA)
Gunbuster 3 (TBA)

as Fukushima Gaina

Television series 
Hulaing Babies (2019)
Hulaing Babies☆Petit (2020)

ONAs 
Tabechattate Ii no ni na! (2018)

References

External links
  
 

Animation studios in Tokyo
Japanese animation studios
Japanese companies established in 2015
Mass media companies established in 2015